The Same Channel is a collaborative studio album by American musician Fat Jon and Belgian musician Styrofoam. It was released on Morr Music in 2006.

Critical reception

Marisa Brown of AllMusic gave the album 4 stars out of 5, describing it as "an indie-electronica/hip-hop album that should thrill backpackers who are tired of soul- and funk-based beats and are looking for something fractured and galactic with that sad mechanicality that is a necessary element of any Morr Music release." Trent Moorman of The Stranger gave the album 3 stars out of 5, commenting that "Fat Jon weighs in like LL Cool J in his prime." Alan Ranta of Tiny Mix Tapes gave the album 3 stars out of 5, writing, "Production wise, Styrofoam's club-friendly, synth-driven electro-pop takes command." Steve Marchese of XLR8R stated, "As a duo, the two deftly weave their art and craft together, retaining their strengths while creating an even more taut and accessible whole." He called the album "An experimental, courageous, and wildly successful coupling of styles."

Track listing

The enhanced CD version of the album contains a music video for "Space Gangsta".

Personnel
Credits adapted from liner notes.

 Jon Marshall – vocals, production, recording
 Arne Van Petegem – vocals, production, recording
 Grace Period – remix (10)
 Human Empire – design

References

External links
 

2006 albums
Collaborative albums
Fat Jon albums
Styrofoam (musician) albums
Morr Music albums
Albums produced by Fat Jon